Lake Hébert is a freshwater body of the southeastern part of Eeyou Istchee James Bay (Municipality), in Jamésie, in the administrative region of Nord-du-Québec, in the province of Quebec, in Canada.

The Hebert Lake straddles the townships of Machault, Royal, Belmont and L'Espinay on the territory of the Eeyou Istchee James Bay (municipality)
Regional Government, southwest of Chapais, Quebec.

Forestry is the main economic activity of the sector. Recreational tourism activities come second, notably thanks to various navigable water bodies located in the area.

The hydrographic slope of Lac Hébert is accessible via the forest road R1009 (North-South direction) serving the western part of the lake and the road R1053
(East-West direction) serving the eastern part of the lake.

The surface of Lake Hébert is generally frozen from early November to mid-May, however, safe ice circulation is generally from mid-November to mid-April.

Geography

Toponymy
The term "Hebert" is a family name of French origin.

The toponym "lac Hébert" was formalized on December 5, 1968, by the Commission de toponymie du Québec, when it was created.

Notes and references

See also 

Eeyou Istchee James Bay
Lakes of Nord-du-Québec
Nottaway River drainage basin